Joseph Gerard Santamaria  (born 14 July 1948) is an Australian jurist and a former judge of the Court of Appeal of the Supreme Court of Victoria. He was appointed to the Court of Appeal in August 2013 and retired in July 2018. He is a Senior Fellow in the Juris Doctor programme at the Melbourne Law School.

Education and career

Santamaria attended St Patrick's College, East Melbourne.  He graduated with a Bachelor of Arts and a Bachelor of Laws with honours from the University of Melbourne. He later attended University College, Oxford, where he graduated with a Bachelor of Civil Law and a Bachelor of Letters.

Santamaria was admitted to legal practice in 1973.  In 1977, he took up a full-time position as an academic at Melbourne Law School. In 1978, he was called to the Victorian Bar and was appointed Queen's Counsel in 1994.  He practised primarily in commercial law and equity. In August 2013, he joined the Court of Appeal, where he remained until his retirement in July 2018. He is a Senior Fellow in the Juris Doctor programme at the Melbourne Law School.

Together with Ian Renard, Santamaria is the co-author of Takeovers and Reconstructions in Australia. Between 1978 and 1990, Santamaria was a reporter for the Commonwealth Law Reports.

Personal

Santamaria is a son of Australian political activist B. A. Santamaria.

References 

20th-century King's Counsel
Judges of the Supreme Court of Victoria
Melbourne Law School alumni
Alumni of University College, Oxford
1948 births
Living people
Academic staff of the University of Melbourne
Australian King's Counsel